Sveti Jurij ob Ščavnici is a settlement in northeastern Slovenia. It is the seat of the Municipality of Sveti Jurij ob Ščavnici. It lies on the Ščavnica River in the region known as Prlekija. The area is part of the traditional region of Styria. The municipality is now included in the Mura Statistical Region.

Name
The settlement was first mentioned in written sources in 1680 under name Videm (borrowed from Middle High German videme 'church property'—originally, 'property left by the deceased to the church'). The settlement was known as Videm ob Ščavnici (literally, 'church property on the Ščavnica River') until 1997. On January 22, 1997 the municipal authorities mistakenly assumed that the name had been changed from a religious name under communist Yugoslavia, and it was changed to match the parish name Sveti Jurij ob Ščavnici (literally, 'Saint George on the Ščavnica River').

Church

The local parish church is dedicated to Saint George and belongs to the Roman Catholic Diocese of Murska Sobota. It dates to the 13th century with numerous rebuildings, adaptations, and renovations over the following centuries.

Notable people
Notable people that were born or lived in Sveti Jurij ob Ščavnici include:
Vekoslav Grmič (1923–2005), theologian
Edvard Kocbek (1904–1981), poet
Bratko Kreft (1905–1996), playwright
Ivan Kreft (1906–1985), diplomat

References

External links
 Sveti Jurij ob Ščavnici at Geopedia

Populated places in the Municipality of Sveti Jurij ob Ščavnici